Welcome to Woop Woop is a 1997 Australian comedy film directed by Stephan Elliott and starring Johnathon Schaech and Rod Taylor. The film was based on the novel The Dead Heart by Douglas Kennedy. "Woop Woop" is an Australian colloquialism referring to an inexact location, usually in rural or remote Australia.

Plot
Teddy (Johnathon Schaech) is a New York bird smuggler who goes to Australia to replace a flock of escaped birds after a deal goes awry. While there, he has a wild liaison with a quirky, sexually ravenous girl, Angie (Susie Porter), who, after a brief courtship, knocks him unconscious and kidnaps him. When he awakes, he finds himself "married" to her - not legally - and stranded in Woop Woop, a desolate, dilapidated town hidden within a crater-like rock formation in Aboriginal territory. The residents are people who lived there at an asbestos mining camp before the land was handed over to the Aboriginal peoples; following a tragedy in 1979, Woop Woop was abandoned and literally "erased" from the Australian map. Not content with the deal given to them by the mining company (from Fremantle), they opted to return to their old lives in Woop Woop. At first, they repopulated themselves incestuously, which caused wide mental instability. A rule was then enacted ("Rule #3"), preventing residents from sleeping with their relatives. Since then, outsiders like Teddy have been occasionally kidnapped to keep Woop Woop populated.

Their only export is dog food made from road-killed kangaroos. The town is run by Angie's father, Daddy-O (Rod Taylor), in an authoritarian manner, that he disguises as communal (he and the other town elders keep the best luxuries for themselves in secret while doling out only the usual canned pineapple and sub-par tobacco to the others). The only entertainment available to the residents is old Rodgers & Hammerstein films and soundtracks, the latter of which they play constantly. These are presumably leftover from the town's last official contact with the civilized world.

After witnessing another kidnapping, 'Midget,' the local hairdresser, is shot dead by Daddy-O during an attempted escape. Teddy soon realizes he will be trapped in Woop Woop for life unless he finds a way out for himself. Initially, he repairs his VW van, which had been vandalized by the locals, only to have it vandalized again by Daddy-O. In addition, the Australian Cattle Dog that he adopts is shot as part of 'Dog Day.' He befriends a couple of locals, including the scruffy, affable Duffy and Krystal, Angie's sister, who help him confront Daddy-O's iron-fisted reign and arrange an escape plan. Duffy, reprimanded by Daddy-O for breaking 'Rule #3,' nonetheless elects to stay in Woop Woop, while Teddy, Krystal, and Krystal's pet cockatoo escape.

Cast
 Johnathon Schaech as Teddy
 Rod Taylor as Daddy-O
 Susie Porter as Angie
 Dee Smart as Krystal
 Richard Moir as Reggie
 Maggie Kirkpatrick as Ginger
 Barry Humphries as Blind Wally
 Mark Wilson as Duffy
 Paul Mercurio as Midget
 Baden Jones as Leon
 Rachel Griffiths as Sylvia
 Tina Louise as Bella

Soundtrack

A soundtrack was released by Universal Music Group.
 "Perhaps, Perhaps, Perhaps" - Cake
 "There is Nothin' Like a Dame" - Reel Big Fish
 "Timebomb" - Chumbawamba
 "I Can't Say No" - Poe
 "Welcome to Your Life (Woop, Woop)" - Boy George
 "I Got You Babe" - Merril Bainbridge and Shaggy
 "Bali Ha'i" - Moodswings and Neneh Cherry
 "Dog's Life" - eels
 "You'll Never Walk Alone" - Robin S.
 "Climb Every Mountain" - Peggy Wood and Junior Vasquez

Release

Critical reception

Elliot's earlier film release, The Adventures of Priscilla, Queen of the Desert had been a Cannes hit in 1994. The uncompleted Welcome to Woop Woop was screened "out of competition" at the 1997 Cannes Film Festival an experience Elliott described as "excruciating".

Australian film critic Michael Adams later included Welcome to Woop Woop on his list of the worst ever Australian films, along with Phantom Gold, The Glenrowan Affair, Houseboat Horror, The Pirate Movie, Les Patterson Saves the World and Pandemonium.

It has become a cult classic in the years following its release, notably loved by RuPaul.

Box office
Welcome to Woop Woop grossed $489,725 at the box office in Australia.

See also
 Cinema of Australia

References

External links
 
 
 
 
 Welcome to Woop Woop at the National Film and Sound Archive
Welcome to Woop Woop at Oz Movies
 

1997 films
Australian adventure comedy films
1997 independent films
1990s English-language films
Films directed by Stephan Elliott
1990s adventure comedy films
Films based on American novels
Films set in the Northern Territory
Films set in New York City
Films shot in the Northern Territory
Films shot in Oregon
Australian independent films
The Samuel Goldwyn Company films
Films scored by Guy Gross
1997 comedy films